Elena Subirats Simon (30 December 1947 – 28 March 2018) was a Mexican professional tennis player.

Raised in Mexico City, Subirats was a singles gold medalist for her country at the 1966 Central American and Caribbean Games and 1967 Pan American Games. 

Subirats reached the singles quarter-finals of the 1968 French Open, beating fourth seed Rosie Casals en route.

Between 1968 and 1973 she was a playing member of the Mexico Federation Cup team and featured in 16 rubbers, for seven singles and two doubles wins. 

Subirats' brother Jaime was also a tennis player.

References

External links
 
 
 

1947 births
2018 deaths
Mexican female tennis players
Tennis players from Mexico City
Pan American Games medalists in tennis
Pan American Games gold medalists for Mexico
Pan American Games silver medalists for Mexico
Pan American Games bronze medalists for Mexico
Medalists at the 1963 Pan American Games
Medalists at the 1967 Pan American Games
Tennis players at the 1963 Pan American Games
Tennis players at the 1967 Pan American Games
Competitors at the 1966 Central American and Caribbean Games
Central American and Caribbean Games gold medalists for Mexico
Central American and Caribbean Games medalists in tennis
20th-century Mexican women